Henry Eliot may refer to:

Henry Eliot Howard (1873–1940), amateur English ornithologist
Henry Eliot, 5th Earl of St Germans (1835–1911)
Henry Ware Eliot (1843–1919), American industrialist and philanthropist
Henry Eliot (author), British author

See also
Henry Elliot (disambiguation)
Henry Elliott (disambiguation)